Haley Mack (born May 29, 1998) is an American ice hockey forward, currently playing with the Minnesota Whitecaps of the Premier Hockey Federation (PHF). She was drafted in the fourth round, 23rd overall by the Whitecaps in the 2020 NWHL Draft.

Playing career 
She attended East Grand Forks Senior High School and played on the school's girls' ice hockey team in the Minnesota State High School League (MSHSL), setting a school record for points in a season with 72 points (38 goals + 34 assists) in the 2013–14 season.

From 2016 to 2020, she attended Bemidji State University and played with the Bemidji State Beavers women's ice hockey programme, scoring 77 points across 132 NCAA Division I games. She scored a career-high 28 points in 37 games in her senior year, leading the team in scoring and being named to the WCHA All-Academic Team for the third time.  She finished her university career as the fifth highest goal scorer in the programme's history.

She was drafted 23rd overall by the Minnesota Whitecaps in the 2020 NWHL Draft, the first Bemidji State player to ever be drafted into the NWHL. In September 2020, she signed her first professional contract with the team for the 2020–21 NWHL season.

Awards and honors 
 Finalist, 2021 NWHL Newcomer of the Year

Personal life  
Her father, Jason Mack, also played ice hockey for Bemidji State University, serving as team captain of the men's program in the early 90s.

References

External links

1998 births
Living people
American women's ice hockey forwards
People from East Grand Forks, Minnesota
Ice hockey players from Minnesota
Minnesota Whitecaps players
Bemidji State Beavers women's ice hockey players
Premier Hockey Federation players